Faye is a heavily eroded lunar impact crater in the rugged southern highlands of the Moon. It is named after French astronomer Hervé Faye. It is attached to the northeastern rim of the crater Delaunay, with Donati located just a few kilometers to the northeast. It forms part of a chain of craters of increasing size to the southwest that continues with La Caille and ends with the walled plain Purbach.

The rim of Faye is heavily damaged, particularly along the western half and covers much of the southwestern interior floor. The rim is nearly non-existent in the northwest, where a gap joins the interior with the surrounding terrain. The surviving interior floor is relatively featureless, with a central peak rising at the midpoint. There is a small craterlet and the incised remnant of a small crater rim in the northeast part of the floor.

Satellite craters
By convention these features are identified on lunar maps by placing the letter on the side of the crater midpoint that is closest to Faye.

References

External links

Faye at The Moon Wiki 

Impact craters on the Moon